Thomas Richard Lloyd (1820 – 10 May 1891) was a Welsh Anglican priest, who spent his entire ministry in one parish, and eisteddfod participant.

Lloyd was born in Denbigh, Wales, and studied at Ruthin School and Jesus College, Oxford. He was ordained deacon in 1843, the year he obtained his Bachelor of Arts degree from Oxford, and ordained priest the following year. He was appointed as curate of Llanfynydd, Carmarthenshire, Wales in the parish of Hope, Flintshire in 1843 and became rector in 1845.

References

1820 births
1891 deaths
People educated at Ruthin School
Alumni of Jesus College, Oxford
19th-century Welsh Anglican priests
People from Denbigh